Vikram-S is India's first privately built rocket was lifted on 18 November 2022 at 11am from Sriharikota launchpad by Indian Space Research Organisation. The development of rocket was done by Skyroot Aerospace.

History 

Vikram-S,India's first privately built rocket was launched on 18 November 2022 by Indian Space Research Organisation from Srihari Kota. The mission for the rocket launch has been named as 'Prarambh',meaning beginning. As a tribute the rocket has been named after Vikram Sarabhai,who is considered as father of India's space programme.

Rocket Built up 

Vikram-S rocket was developed by Skyroot Aerospace and was assissted for launch by ISRO and IN-SPACe (Indian National Space Promotion and Authorisation Centre). The rocket reached an altitude of 89.5 km Apogee (point away from Earth).

See also
Vikram (rocket)
 Skyroot Aerospace
 Bellatrix Aerospace
 Indian Space Research Organisation
 Small-lift launch vehicle
 Launch vehicle
 Space industry of India

References 

Indian Space Research Organisation
Rocket launches in 2022
Spacecraft launched by India in 2022